Anhalt-Aschersleben was a short-lived principality of the Holy Roman Empire ruled by the House of Ascania with its residence at Aschersleben in present-day Saxony-Anhalt. It emerged as a subdivision from the Principality of Anhalt from 1252 to 1315.

History

It was created when the Anhalt territory was divided among the sons of Prince Henry I into the Principalities of Anhalt-Aschersleben, Anhalt-Bernburg and Anhalt-Zerbst in 1252. Prince Henry II the Fat, the eldest son of Henry I, had been co-ruler of his father since 1244. In the course of the partition he chose the Anhalt ancestral homeland north of the Harz mountain range around the Ascanian residence of Aschersleben (Ascharia), which he granted town privileges in 1266.

When in 1315 Henry's grandson Otto II died without male heirs, the principality — including the capital of Aschersleben — was seized as a fief by his cousin and creditor Bishop Albert of Halberstadt. Though Prince Bernhard II of Anhalt-Bernburg one year later acknowledged the feudal tenure of Halberstadt, Aschersleben was the cause for several conflicts between his successors and the Halberstadt bishops. Nevertheless, it remained part of the diocese, which in 1648 was secularized into the Principality of Halberstadt, and its sovereign possessions, including the rights to Anhalt-Aschersleben, were given to Brandenburg-Prussia.

Princes of Anhalt-Aschersleben 1252–1315
 1252–1266 Henry II
 1266–1304 Otto I
 1266–1283 Henry III, brother and co-regent
 1304–1315 Otto II

References

1250s establishments in the Holy Roman Empire
1252 establishments in Europe
1310s disestablishments in the Holy Roman Empire
1315 disestablishments in Europe
States and territories established in 1252
House of Ascania
Lists of princes
History of Anhalt
Principalities of the Holy Roman Empire